"Here Comes Tomorrow" is the eighth and final story arc in Grant Morrison's run on the Marvel Comics series New X-Men, which ran from issues #151-154 (2004).  The storyline featured many controversial elements, such as Cyclops moving forward with his relationship with Emma Frost (prompted by his dead wife), the Stepford Cuckoos being revealed as a development in the Weapon Plus Program, John Sublime being a sentient bacterium bent on bringing evolution to a halt and hints that the Xavier Institute student Ernst and Cassandra Nova are the same person.

The Official Handbook to the Marvel Universe: Alternate Universes has given the numerical designation of Earth-15104 to the Here Comes Tomorrow timeline.

Plot

In the far future, human X-Man Tom Skylark evades a pack of Crawlers (foot soldiers genetically engineered from Kurt Wagner's DNA, along with those of Madrox, Scott Summers, and others) amongst the ruins of the X-Mansion.  His Sentinel partner, Rover, dispatches the Crawlers.  Tom is met by E.V.A., a representative of the Xavier Institute, now an interspecies organization.  Together, they transport the Phoenix Egg, found on the moon, to the X-Men's secure headquarters in the Manhattan Crater.  But a Crawler has hitched a ride inside the compound, replicating itself with Multiple Man DNA and attacks.  E.V.A. and Tom are rescued by a bird-man named Tito (descended from Beak), but the Phoenix Egg is teleported back to the Crawlers' master and creator: The Beast, a white-haired Henry McCoy.

The "Three-in-One" Stepford Cuckoos relate the downfall of human civilization throughout history to Wolverine, to which Cassandra Nova adds recent bad omens.  She says that something in the past went wrong to give the Earth such a dystopic future, but no one knows what exactly.  One hundred-fifty years in the past, at the grave site of Jean Grey, Cyclops gives up on superheroics and changing humanity, turning down Emma Frost's offer to re-open the Xavier Institute as well as her offer to begin a real relationship with her.

Back in the future, Tom Skylark relates how the Proud People of the Starlit City, the last free outpost in Europe, fell to Apollyon the Destroyer, herald of the Beast.  Their sacrifice allowed him to escape with the Phoenix Egg, but Tom laments his losing it.  E.V.A asks him to join the X-Men for one last direct assault against the Beast.  The Cuckoos speak before Wolverine and Cassandra Nova of the consequences of defeat: genetic enslavement by the Beast, loss of all natural evolution and species propagation.  When asked to look hard and unblinking at the future, the Cuckoos see judgment by the Phoenix.  As Beast hatches Jean Grey, a living fire-goddess, from the Phoenix Egg, she recognizes him as Henry, but he says he is much older than that, that now his name is Sublime.

The Phoenix annihilates the Terminds, an insect species in Panafrika, but an encounter with X-Men liaison Bumbleboy spurs old memories in Jean's mind, calling Beast's plans of destruction into question.  At the edges of Beast's Transatlantis territory, the X-Men engage the Crawler army, but despite a minor victory, Wolverine sees Jean Grey amidst the reinforcements, clad in a revealing black variant of her Dark Phoenix outfit.  Cassandra, working in the X-Jet with No-Girl, instructs her to remove the Phoenix Crown, which gives Jean back her memories and returns her to a human form.  Logan shows Jean the truth of Beast's history: John Sublime was a host for the Sublime bacteria, a sentient lifeform billions of years old that infected countless species and sowed aggression and conflict to ensure its genetic dominance, so that no one species would ever be hardy enough to outlast it.  U-Men, super-Sentinels, nano-viruses, etc. all created by an underlying disease.  When Scott Summers left the institute, Hank McCoy tried to manage things, but things fell apart, and when he tried the drug Kick to cope with the stress, he was infected by Sublime (the true nature of the "drug").

Cassandra, pleased with her work, exchanges one more conversation with Martha before the Beast, possessed by Sublime and with the power of the Phoenix, kills her.  The other X-Men all perish at the hands of the Beast, who declares himself supreme, ready to 'Remake God in [his] Image!' - only for Jean to reveal that they were not an attack force, just a distraction.  Smiling, she removes Sublime from Beast's body, briefly returning him to normal.  Seconds after apologizing, he is decapitated by Apollyon, who promptly unmasks and finds the world not as perfect as hoped.  In an extra-dimensional plane within the ancient M'Kraan Crystal called the White Hot Room, numerous other hosts of the Phoenix (most notably Quentin Quire) instruct Jean, now dressed in a white and gold version of her Phoenix costume (thus establishing her as the White Phoenix of the Crown), to repair the broken timeline.  Reaching back in time, Jean pushes Scott "to live".  Cyclops agrees to re-open the institute, and stand side by side with Emma Frost for the future.

In other media
Rover the Sentinel appears in an eponymous episode of Wolverine and the X-Men. Rover is a Sentinel reprogrammed by Polaris who befriends future X-Man Marrow.

Collected editions
The series has been collected into a trade paperback:

Here Comes Tomorrow (collects New X-Men #151-154)

As well as:

New X-Men Omnibus (collects New X-Men #114-154 and Annual 2001, 992 pages, December 2006 )
 New X-Men by Grant Morrison Ultimate Collection: Volume 3 (collects New X-Men #142-154, 336 pages, December 2008)

References

Marvel Comics dimensions
New X-Men story arcs